An Accredited European School is a type of international school under national jurisdiction and financing, within the member states of the European Union, which have been approved, by the Board of Governors of the international organisation "The European Schools", to offer its multilingual and multicultural curriculum and the European Baccalaureate. An Accredited European School differs from a European School, in that the latter is set up, administered and financed directly by the Board of Governors of the European Schools.

The establishments originated following a 2005 report by the European Parliament, investigating the future of the European School system, particularly in how to "open up" the formerly exclusive establishments to a wider audience.

As of September 2021, there are twenty Accredited European Schools located in thirteen EU countries, with a further five schools engaged in the accreditation process.

Legal status
The accredited status groups together, what were formerly known as "Type II" and "Type III" European Schools, with the only difference being that "Type II" European Schools give priority, for enrolment purposes, to children of staff of the EU institutions and are therefore entitled to receive funding from the European Commission in proportion to the number of such EU staff pupils enrolled.

Locations
As of September 2021, there are twenty Accredited European Schools located in thirteen EU countries, with a further five schools engaged in the accreditation process.

Former locations

See also
European Baccalaureate
European School
European Schools

References

External links
 About Accredited European Schools

 
Educational policies and initiatives of the European Union
European Schools (intergovernmental organisation)